The 2011 Turkish Cup Final was the 49th final match of the Turkish Cup. The match took place on 11 May 2011, at Kadir Has Stadium in Kayseri. The match was played between 8 time winners Beşiktaş and first time finalists İstanbul B.B. The referee of the match was Yunus Yıldırım.

Because of its current situation in the 2010–11 Süper Lig, Beşiktaş entered the final looking to secure a berth to 2011–12 UEFA Europa League next year as well as winning its 9th cup in team history. İstanbul B.B., which showed superiority towards Beşiktaş in the Süper Lig, played in the Turkish Cup final for the first time in their history.

After normal time and extra time ended on a 2–2 draw, Beşiktaş won the penalty shootout 4–3 and won its 9th Turkish Cup.
By winning, Beşiktaş secured a berth in the play-off round of the UEFA Europa League.

On June 10, 2013 UEFA officially opened up disciplinary proceedings against Beşiktaş in regard to match-fixing in the 2011 Turkish Cup final.

Background
Beşiktaş reached the Turkish Cup final for the 15th time in their history. Previously winning the cup 8 times, Beşiktaş entered as the favored team. İstanbul B.B., on the other hand, was entering the final for the first time in their history. İstanbul B.B.'s best performance in the Turkish Cup was in the 2009-10 Turkish Cup season, when they reached the quarter finals.

In the 2010–11 Süper Lig, İstanbul B.B. showed superiority against Beşiktaş, winning 2–0 at İnönü and 2–1 at Atatürk Olympic Stadium. However Beşiktaş had amassed more points than İstanbul B.B., with 50 points while İstanbul B.B. had only 41 points.

Beşiktaş started the 2010–11 Turkish Cup in the play-off round, defeating Mersin İdmanyurdu 3–0. In the group stage, Beşiktaş was placed in group B with Gaziantep B.B., Trabzonspor, Konya Torku Şekerspor and Manisaspor. Beşiktaş won the group and preceded to the quarter finals where they defeated Gaziantep B.B. 5-0 and 3-0 respectively. In the semi finals, Beşiktaş defeated Gaziantepspor with 3–0 and 2–2 scores, thus earning a berth in the final.

Match details

See also
2010–11 Turkish Cup
2011 Turkish Super Cup

References

2011 Final
Cup
Turkish Cup Final 2011
Turkish Cup Final 2011
Sport in Kayseri
Turkish Cup Final 2011